Adam Keir Rodger (1855–1946) was Coalition Liberal MP for Rutherglen from 1918 to 1922. At the age of 27 he started the Scottish Temperance Assurance Society Limited (later known as Scottish Mutual Assurance). The business was launched due to Rodger's faith in temperance. The company nearly went bankrupt when its first policy holder died requiring a payment of £1000. The company later sold a policy to David Lloyd George and is now credited to launching the assurance business in Scotland.

References

External links 
 

1855 births
1946 deaths
Scottish temperance activists
Scottish businesspeople
Scottish Liberal Party MPs
Members of the Parliament of the United Kingdom for Scottish constituencies
UK MPs 1918–1922